Philippine Practical Shooting Association (PPSA) is the Philippine association for practical shooting under the International Practical Shooting Confederation. PPSA was founded in 11. November 1982 by Jack Enrile and other shooting sport enthusiasts, and the first formal match was held in April 1983. PPSA was formally accepted by IPSC as its 23rd member region in 1986.

External links 
 Official homepage of the Philippine Practical Shooting Association

References 

Regions of the International Practical Shooting Confederation
Practical Shooting
Sports organizations established in 1982
1982 establishments in the Philippines